The women's 4×100 metre freestyle relay event at the 1968 Olympic Games took place October 26. The relay featured teams of four swimmers each swimming two lengths of the 50 m pool freestyle.

Medalists

Results

Heats
Heat 1

Heat 2

Heat 3

Final

References

Swimming at the 1968 Summer Olympics
4 × 100 metre freestyle relay
1968 in women's swimming
Women's events at the 1968 Summer Olympics